Senorita de Aranjuez is an album by pianist George Cables that was recorded in 2001 and released by the Japanese Meldac Jazz label.

Reception

The AllMusic review by Judith Schlesinger said "this one is surprisingly tame. There are some intriguing inventions ... but more often these three excellent musicians seem less than fully challenged by the material ... there's more desert than oasis. Not anyone's best CD".

Track listing 
 "It Could Happen to You" (Jimmy Van Heusen, Johnny Burke) – 4:58
 "Senorita de Aranjuez" (George Cables) – 5:41
 "Gymnopedie #1" (Erik Satie) — 7:03
 "Black Orpheus" (Luiz Bonfá) – 6:07
 "Spring Can Really Hang You up the Most" (Tommy Wolf, Fran Landesman) – 7:17
 "Unchained Melody" (Alex North, Hy Zaret) – 7:55
 "It's Impossible" (Armando Manzanero, Sid Wayne) – 7:00
 "The Summer Knows" (Michel Legrand, Alan Bergman, Marilyn Bergman) – 5:08
 "All the Things You Are" (Jerome Kern, Oscar Hammerstein II) – 5:09
 "Sweet Rita Suite" (Cables) – 5:21

Personnel 
George Cables – piano
George Mraz - bass 
Victor Lewis – drums

References 

George Cables albums
2001 albums